This is a list of schools in the London Borough of Sutton, England.

State-funded schools

Primary schools

 Abbey Primary School
 All Saints Benhilton CE Primary School
 All Saints Carshalton CE Primary School
 Avenue Primary Academy
 Bandon Hill Primary School
 Barrow Hedges Primary School
 Beddington Infants' School
 Beddington Park Academy
 Brookfield Primary Academy
 Cheam Common Infants' Academy
 Cheam Common Junior Academy
 Cheam Fields Primary Academy
 Cheam Park Farm Primary Academy
 Culvers House Primary School
 Devonshire Primary School
 Dorchester Primary School
 Foresters Primary School
 Greenwrythe Primary School
 Hackbridge Primary School
 Harris Junior Academy Carshalton
 Highview Primary School
 Holy Trinity CE Junior School
 Manor Park Primary Academy
 Muschamp Primary School
 Nonsuch Primary School
 Robin Hood Infants' School
 Robin Hood Junior School
 Rushy Meadow Primary Academy
 St Cecilia's RC Primary School
 St Dunstan's Primary School
 St Elphege's RC Infants' School
 St Elphege's RC Junior School
 St Mary's RC Infants' School
 St Mary's RC Junior School
 Stanley Park Infants' School
 Stanley Park Junior School
 Tweeddale Primary School
 Victor Seymour Infants' School
 Wallington Primary Academy
 Westbourne Primary School
 Wood Field Primary School

Non-selective secondary schools

Carshalton Boys Sports College 
Carshalton High School for Girls
Cheam High School
Glenthorne High School
Greenshaw High School
Harris Academy Sutton
The John Fisher School*
Oaks Park High School
Overton Grange School
St Philomena's Catholic High School for Girls

*This school is located in Croydon, but is administered by Sutton

Grammar schools
Nonsuch High School for Girls 
Sutton Grammar School  
Wallington County Grammar School  
Wallington High School for Girls  
Wilson's School

Special and alternative schools
Carew Academy
Link Primary School
Link Secondary School
The Limes College
Sherwood Park School
Sutton Tuition and Reintegration Service
Wandle Valley Academy

Further education
Carshalton College
Sutton College
Carshalton Athletic Academy

Independent schools

Primary and preparatory schools
Collingwood School
Homefield Preparatory School
Seaton House School

Senior and all-through schools
Sutton High School

Special and alternative schools
Brookways School
Eagle House School

Sutton
Schools